WUC may refer to:
 Water Utilities Corporation (Botswana), a government-owned corporation that provides water and waste water management services in Botswana.
 World Universities Congress 2010
 World Uyghur Congress
 WWE Universal Championship